Turriff United Football Club are a senior football club currently playing in the Highland Football League in Scotland. They play their matches at The Haughs, beside the River Deveron in Turriff, Aberdeenshire. They joined the Highland League for the 2009–10 season, having been accepted into the league on 25 February 2009. Prior to joining the Highland League, they were a Scottish Junior Football Association club, playing in the Scottish Junior Football North Premier League.

Turriff finished in the top half of the table only once in their first five seasons in the Highland League, but their fortunes improved significantly in the 2014–15 season. The club recovered from early-season setbacks (their heaviest-ever league defeat, 8–0 by defending champions Brora Rangers, followed by a three-point penalty for fielding an ineligible player in their opening match) to beat their previous record of 16 wins in a season with 14 matches still to play. Turriff went on to compile a 23-match unbeaten run, during which they briefly led the league table following a 1–0 win over Deveronvale on 3 January 2015, and again following a 3–0 victory over Huntly four weeks later. On both occasions the second-placed club, Brora Rangers, had two games in hand. Turriff remained Brora's closest rivals for the rest of the season, until Brora finally took the title with a 2–1 win over Turriff at The Haughs on 28 March. A week later, Turriff secured second place when a draw between their own closest rivals, Cove Rangers and Wick Academy, left both clubs unable to close the gap.

The club made its Scottish Cup debut in 2012, beating Burntisland Shipyard, Civil Service Strollers and Buckie Thistle to reach the fourth round, in which a 1–1 draw at home to Greenock Morton made them the last surviving non-SFL/SPL side in the competition, before being knocked out in the replay. 
In 2013–14, Turriff reached the third round, beating Selkirk and Wick Academy before going out to Stirling Albion. In 2014–15 they beat Lossiemouth in the first round, before losing to Clyde in the second. 
By virtue of finishing as runners up in the Highland League, they entered the 2015–16 competition in the second round, before losing to Fraserburgh.

Changes to the entry criteria of the Scottish Challenge Cup allowed Turriff to take part for the first time in 2016-17. They reached the third round, losing to Hibernian. The game set a new home attendance record for Turriff (1,791) and was their first match to be televised live (on BBC Alba). 

Turriff's most consistent success as a senior club has been in the Aberdeenshire Shield competition, which they have won three times. During the 2013–14 competition, their semi-final match against Cove Rangers was declared void and ordered to be replayed after it emerged that both teams had fielded ineligible players (in Turriff's case, the player was an unused substitute). The decision was to Turriff's advantage, as they had lost the original match - but went on to win the replay and so reach the final for the second year running. 
In 2015, they again beat Cove Rangers in the semi-final to become finalists three years in a row.

The club's official mascot is Moo the Coo, an anthropomorphised male counterpart to the town's unofficial emblem, the Turra Coo.

The Haughs

The Haughs is the club's home ground and is located by the River Deveron near the centre of Turriff. The Haughs hosted the decisive match in the 2014–15 Highland Football League season, Brora Rangers being declared champions after beating Turriff, their closest rivals 2–1.

Senior competition record

Aberdeenshire Shield
 2010 – 1st round
 2011 – Champions (final vs Aberdeen 2–0)
 2012 – Semi-final
 2013 – Champions (final vs Cove Rangers 6–1)
 2014 – Runners-up (final vs Inverurie Loco Works 0–5)
 2015 – Champions (final vs Fraserburgh 4–3)
 2016 – 2nd round
 2017 – Semi-final

Highland Football League (18 teams)
 2009–10 – 13th
 2010–11 – 8th
 2011–12 – 14th
 2012–13 – 11th
 2013–14 – 12th
 2014–15 – 2nd
 2015–16 – 4th
 2016–17 – 7th

Scottish Cup
 2012–13 – 4th round (last 32)
 2013–14 – 3rd round
 2014–15 – 2nd round
 2015–16 – 2nd round 
 2016–17 – 1st round

Other competitions

Turriff have reached the semi-finals of the Highland League Cup three times (2011–12, 2014–15, 2015–16) and the semi-finals of the Aberdeenshire Cup once (2012–13).
They also reached the 3rd round of the 2016-17 Scottish Challenge Cup, where they lost 3-0 to Hibernian at The Haughs in front of a record crowd of 1,791. The game was broadcast live on BBC Alba and was the first time a Highland League club have ever featured in a live TV game.

Senior honours
Aberdeenshire Shield: 2010–11, 2012–13, 2014–15
Aberdeenshire League: 2021–22

Junior honours
North Region First Division (East) winners: 2002–03
North Regional Cup winners: 2006–07
North East League Cup winners: 1984–85
McLeman Cup winners: 1985–86
Grill League Cup winners: 2006–07
Duthie Cup winners: 1987–88
Aberdeen Cable TV Cup winners: 1988–89
North Drybrough Cup winners: 1986–87

References

External links
 Official website

Football clubs in Scotland
Highland Football League teams
Scottish Junior Football Association clubs
Association football clubs established in 1954
1954 establishments in Scotland
Football in Aberdeenshire
Turriff